Alexandre Menezes, also known as Xandão, is a Brazilian guitarist and a member of the band O Rappa since its formation. During the Acústico MTV tour, he played several instruments such as the mandolin, acoustic guitar and cavaquinho.

Brazilian guitarists
Brazilian male guitarists
Brazilian composers
Brazilian mandolinists
Living people
Year of birth missing (living people)